Ross Case and Geoff Masters were the defending champions, but lost in the second round to Mark Edmondson and John Marks.

Bob Hewitt and Frew McMillan defeated Peter Fleming and John McEnroe in the final, 6–1, 6–4, 6–2 to win the gentlemen's doubles title at the 1978 Wimbledon Championships.

Seeds

  Bob Hewitt /  Frew McMillan (champions)
  Wojciech Fibak /  Tom Okker (semifinals)
  Bob Lutz /  Stan Smith  (second round)
  John Alexander /  Phil Dent (semifinals)
  Vitas Gerulaitis /  Sandy Mayer (quarterfinals)
  Ross Case /  Geoff Masters (second round)
  Fred McNair /  Raúl Ramírez (quarterfinals)
  Ray Ruffels /  Allan Stone (first round)
  Marty Riessen /  Dick Stockton (third round)
 n/a
  Syd Ball /  Kim Warwick (third round)
  Colin Dowdeswell /  Chris Kachel (quarterfinals)
  Ray Moore /  Roscoe Tanner (first round)
  Gene Mayer /  Hank Pfister (third round)
  Álvaro Fillol /  Jaime Fillol (first round)
  John Newcombe /  Tony Roche (third round)

Draw

Finals

Top half

Section 1

Section 2

Bottom half

Section 3

Section 4

References

External links

1978 Wimbledon Championships – Men's draws and results at the International Tennis Federation

Men's Doubles
Wimbledon Championship by year – Men's doubles